The Lo Nuestro Award for Regional Mexican Group or Duo of the Year  is an award presented annually by American network Univision. It was first awarded in 1989 and has been given annually since. The accolade was established to recognize the most talented performers of Latin music. The nominees and winners were originally selected by a voting poll conducted among program directors of Spanish-language radio stations in the United States and also based on chart performance on Billboard Latin music charts, with the results being tabulated and certified by the accounting firm Deloitte. At the present time, the winners are selected by the audience through an online survey. The trophy awarded is shaped in the form of a treble clef.

The award was first presented to Mexican band Los Bukis. American group Intocable holds the record for the most awards, winning on five occasions out of seven nominations. Mexican band La Original Banda el Limón de Salvador Lizarraga are the most nominated band without a win, with four unsuccessful nominations.

Winners and nominees
Listed below are the winners of the award for each year, as well as the other nominees for the majority of the years awarded.

References

Regional Mexican Group or Duo of the Year
Regional Mexican music groups
Awards established in 1992